This is the discography of Jaco Pastorius (1951–1987), excluding bootlegs and compilations.

Discography

As leader/co-leader 

 1974: Jaco with Pat Metheny, Bruce Ditmas, Paul Bley (Improvising Artists, 1976) – live
 1975: Jaco Pastorius (Epic, 1976)
 1980–81: Word of Mouth (Warner Bros., 1981)
 1982: Invitation (Warner Bros., 1983) – live
 1986: Stuttgart Aria with Biréli Lagrène (Jazzpoint/Le Chant du Monde, 1986)

Posthumous releases:

 Honestly - Solo Live (Jazzpoint, 1991) – recorded in 1986
 Holiday for Pans (Sound Hills, 1993) – recorded in 1980–82
 The Birthday Concert (Warner Bros., 1995) – recorded in 1981
 Golden Roads (Sound Hills, 1997) – recorded in 1986
 A Good Stitch for Golden Roads (Sound Hills, 1997) – recorded in 1986
 Punk Jazz: The Jaco Pastorius Anthology (Warner Bros./Rhino, 2003) [2CD] – recorded in 1968–86
 The Early Years Recordings (Holiday Park, 2006) – recorded in 1969–74
 Trio of Doom with John McLaughlin and Tony Williams (Columbia, 2007) – recorded in 1979
 Legendary Demo & Live Tracks (Victor, 2008) – recorded in 1970, 1974, 1976, and 1982
 Word of Mouth Band featuring Kazumi Watanabe, Word of Mouth Band 1983 Japan Tour (Rhino, 2012) [2CD] – recorded in 1983
 Modern American Music...Period! The Criteria Sessions (Omnivore Recordings, 2014) – recorded in 1974
 Truth, Liberty & Soul (Resonance, 2017) – live recorded in 1982
 Jaco Pastorius Bass Workshop: Jazz Concert In Martinique (Altus Jazz, 2017) – live recorded in 1984
 Tokyo 83 (2019) - Recorded at Koseinenkin Kaikan, Tokyo, Japan on May 22, 1983

As group 
Weather Report
 1975–76: Black Market (Columbia, 1976)
 1976–77: Heavy Weather (Columbia, 1977)
 1978: Mr. Gone (Columbia, 1978)
 1979: 8:30 (Columbia, 1979)
 1980: Night Passage (Columbia, 1980)
 1981: Weather Report (Columbia, 1982)

Posthumous compilations:
 Live and Unreleased (Columbia, 2002) [2CD]
 Forecast: Tomorrow (Columbia, 2006) [3CD & DVD-Video]
 The Legendary Live Tapes: 1978-1981 (Columbia, 2015) [4CD]

Trio of Doom
With Tony Williams and John McLaughlin
 Trio of Doom (Columbia Legacy, 2007) – recorded in 1979. posthumous release.

As sideman/guest 

With Randy Bernsen:
 Music for Planets, People & Washing Machines (Amc, 1984) – 2 tracks
 Mo' Wasabi (Zebra, 1986) – 3 tracks
 Paradise Citizens (Zebra, 1988) – 1 track

With Herbie Hancock:
 Sunlight (Columbia, 1978) – 1 track
 Mr. Hands (Columbia, 1980) – 1 track

With Brian Melvin:
 1984–85: Brian Melvin’s Nightfood, Night Food (Timeless, 1985)
 1985: Brian Melvin’s Nightfood, Jazz in Toulouse (Atlus, 2016) [2CD]
 1985: Brian Melvin Trio, Standards Zone (Global Pacific, 1990)
 1984–86 Brian Melvin’s Nightfood, Nightfood (Global Pacific, 1988) – different from 1985 album with similar title
 1986: Brian Melvin Trio, Jazz Street (Timeless, 1988)

With Joni Mitchell:
 1976: Hejira (Asylum, 1976)
 1977: Don Juan's Reckless Daughter (Asylum, 1977)
 1978–79: Mingus (Asylum, 1979)
 1979: Shadows and Light (Asylum, 1980) – live

With others:
 Manolo Badrena, Manolo (A&M, 1979)
 Little Beaver, Party Down (Cat, 1974) – recorded in 1974
 Jimmy Cliff, Cliff Hanger (CBS, 1985) – 1 track
 Cockrell & Santos, New Beginnings (A&M, 1978) 
 Michel Colombier, Michel Colombier (Chrysalis, 1979)
 Deadline, Down by Law (Celluloid, 1985)
 Ian Hunter, All American Alien Boy (Columbia, 1976)
 Albert Mangelsdorff, Trilogue - Live! (MPS, 1977) – recorded in 1976
 Al Di Meola, Land of the Midnight Sun (Columbia, 1976) – recorded in 1975
 Pat Metheny, Bright Size Life (ECM, 1976) – recorded in 1975
 Bob Mintzer, Source (Agharta, 1982)
 Airto Moreira, I'm Fine, How Are You? (Warner Bros., 1977)
 Michel Polnareff, Coucou Me Revoilou (Atlantic, 1978)
 Flora Purim, Everyday Everynight (Warner Bros., 1978)
 Tom Scott, Intimate Strangers (Columbia, 1978)
 Mike Stern, Upside Downside (Atlantic, 1986) –  1 track
 Tommy Strand, Tommy Strand and The Upper Hand, Featuring Jaco Pastorius (Holiday Park, 2009) – recorded in 1971
 Ira Sullivan, Ira Sullivan (Horizon, 1976) – recorded in 1975–76
 Various artists, Havana Jam 2 (Columbia, 1979) [2LP] – 3 tracks
 Various artists, Conrad Sivert Presents Jazz at the Opera House (CBS/Sony, 1983) [2LP] – recorded in 1982

Soundtrack 

 Various artists, including Jaco Pastorius, Jaco (Original Soundtrack) (Columbia, 2015) – posthumous compilation for the 2014 documentary film Jaco on Pastorius' life and musical career

References 

 
Jazz discographies
Discographies of American artists